Piz Blas is a mountain in the Lepontine Alps, located on the border between the cantons of Graubünden and Ticino. At 3,019 metres above sea level, Piz Blas is the highest mountain of Val Cadlimo (Ticino), a valley drained by the Reno da Medel, a tributary of the Rhine. On its northern side (Graubünden), it overlooks the valleys of Lake Curnera and Lake Nalps, both drained by tributaries of the Rhine.

References

External links
Piz Blas on Summitpost
Piz Blas on Hikr

Mountains of the Alps
Alpine three-thousanders
Mountains of Switzerland
Mountains of Graubünden
Mountains of Ticino
Graubünden–Ticino border
Lepontine Alps
Tujetsch